The River Changes is a 1956 American drama film, written and directed by Owen Crump. It stars Rossana Rory, Harold Maresch, and Renate Mannhardt, and was first shown to critics in special screenings on February 14, 1956.

Cast list
 Rossana Rory as Mayram
 Harold Maresch as Kurus
 Renate Mannhardt as Leah
 Henry Fisher as The leader
 Jaspar V. Oertzen as Jonathan
 Nick Solomatin as Asa
 Otto Friebel as The questioner
 Rene Magron as Teman
 Bert Brandt as Aaron
 Ilse Ruth Roskam

References

External links 
 
 
 

West German films
American drama films
German drama films
1956 drama films
1956 films
Warner Bros. films
1950s English-language films
1950s American films
1950s German films
American black-and-white films